Valerius or Valeria was a patrician family at Rome.

Valerius may also refer to:

Given name
 Valerius of Trèves, a 4th-century bishop of Trier
 Valerius of Saragossa, bishop of Zaragoza in 290-315
 Valerius (consul 432), a politician of the Eastern Roman Empire
 Valerius (archbishop of Uppsala), Swedish Archbishop 1207–1219

Surname
 Adriaen Valerius, Dutch poet and composer
 Bertha Valerius, Swedish photographer

See also 
 Valentine (name)

 Valera (disambiguation)
 Vålerenga (disambiguation)